Destroy the Boy is an EP by Sponge, released in 2010.

Track listing
All songs produced by Tim Patalan and Vin Dombroski.

Band members

 Vin Dombroski - vocals
 Billy Adams - drums
 Kyle Neely - guitar and vocals
 Andy Patalan - guitar and vocals
 Tim Patalan - bass

Additional personnel

 Tim Patalan - engineering and mixing
 Andy Patalan - mastering
 Peter Searcy - additional musician on "Star"
 Mike Rand - Booking agent
 DADM Graphics - artwork and layout
 Dave Muzzarelli - inside photo
 Gary Malerba - back cover photo
 Chene-Marie Klimowicz - model on back cover
 Mike Pigeon - Tour manager
 On the Rocks Detroit - tour press and promotion
 Shelia Taylor - website management

References

2010 albums
Sponge (band) albums